George Leverett (February 10, 1883 – March 20, 1968) was an American sound engineer. He was nominated for an Oscar for Best Special Effects on the film The Black Swan at the 15th Academy Awards.

References

External links

1883 births
1968 deaths
American audio engineers
People from Oktibbeha County, Mississippi